St. Norbert Provincial Park is a park in the St. Norbert area of Winnipeg, Manitoba, Canada.

Designated a provincial park by the Government of Manitoba in 1976, it is considered to be a Class V protected area under the IUCN protected area management categories.

See also
List of protected areas of Manitoba
St. Norbert, Winnipeg
Fort Garry Historical Society

References

External links
Find Your Favorite Park: St. Norbert Provincial Park

Provincial parks of Manitoba
Provincial_Park
Protected areas of Manitoba